The Winchester Model 1905 (also known as the Model 05), is a blowback-operated, semi-automatic rifle produced by the Winchester Repeating Arms Company beginning in 1905 and discontinued in 1920. This rifle loads cartridges from a 5 or 10-round capacity, detachable box magazine located immediately forward of the trigger guard. Winchester offered factory chamberings in .32SL and .35 Winchester Self-Loading (.35 WSL).<ref>West, Bill R. (1964) Winchester For Over a Century Stockton Trade Press, p. III-3</ref>

Notably, a Model 1905 in .35 WSL was used by Harry Payne Whitney on an arctic expedition. The rifle proved reliable in extreme low-temperatures, but was insufficiently powerful for taking large game such as musk ox.

The basic design for the Winchester Model 1905 is covered by  issued August 27, 1901 and assigned to Winchester by Thomas Crossley Johnson, a key firearms designer for Winchester. This patent was initially used to protect the design of the rimfire Winchester Model 1903, but came to be applied toward the centerfire Winchester Self Loading rifle series, which includes the Model 1905''', Model 1907 and Model 1910.

In 1941 Winchester designed the M1 Carbine in response to a US Army competition for a light rifle.  The designers were able to adapt the Model 1905 trigger group and magazine for the trials rifle which saved on research and development time.

Variants
In addition to the standard or "plain finish" model, a deluxe or "fancy finish" model was offered with pistol grip stock and checkering on the forearm and wrist of the stock. The plain finish rifles were offered in 1905 at a list price of $28, the fancy finish rifles for $43.

References

External links
The Vintage Semi-Automatic Sporting Rifles Forum - Winchester Model 1905 - http://vintagesemiautorifle.proboards105.com/index.cgi?board=win05

Semi-automatic rifles of the United States
Winchester Repeating Arms Company firearms